Solieria may refer to:
 Solieria (alga), a red alga genus in the family Solieriaceae
 Solieria (fly), a fly genus in the family Tachinidae